Vaudreuil-Soulanges is a regional county municipality in Quebec, Canada. It is located on a triangular peninsula in the western Montérégie region of Quebec, formed by the confluence of the Ottawa River to the north, and the St. Lawrence River to the south. Ontario is located west of here.

Geography
Vaudreuil-Soulanges is part of the St Lawrence Valley. Two million years ago the region was subject to a series of glaciations that covered much of North America. The last in the series was the Wisconsin glaciation. The ice sheet weighed down the landscape. This created the depressions in the land that created the basins for Lake Saint-Louis, Lac des Deux-Montagnes and Lake Saint-Francis. As the ice sheet eroded, the region was mostly submerged 12,000 years ago by an inland saltwater sea known as the Champlain sea. Once the glacier was melted, the land rose again, pushing the saltwater into the sea. 10,000 years ago the body of water, now a fresh water lake, has been named by scholars as Lake Lampsilis.

History
During the French colonial period, the region of New France was divided into several seigneuries populated by French colonists.

 Seigneurie de L'Île-Perrot founded on October 29, 1672 (modern day L'Île-Perrot, Pincourt, Notre-Dame-de-L'Île-Perrot and Terrasse-Vaudreuil)
 Seigneurie de Vaudreuil founded on October 12, 1702 (modern day Vaudreuil-Dorion, Vaudreuil-sur-le-Lac, L'Île-Cadieux, Saint-Lazare and Hudson
 Seigneurie de Soulanges founded on October 12, 1702 (modern day Saint-Clet, Coteau-du-Lac, Les Cèdres and Pointe-des-Cascades)
 Seigneurie de Rigaud founded on October 29, 1732 (modern day Rigaud, Sainte-Marthe, Pointe-Fortune and Très-Saint-Rédempteur)
 Seigneurie de Nouvelle-Longueuil founded on April 21, 1734 (modern day Saint-Polycarpe, Saint-Télesphore, Saint-Zotique, Les Coteaux et Rivière-Beaudette)
 Canton Newton founded in August 1791 (modern day Sainte-Justine-de-Newton, not part of the seigneurie system, was modeled after British township system)

The seigneurial system was finally abolished in 1854, nearly a century after Great Britain took over the territory after defeating France in the Seven Years' War.

It is the only county in Quebec that is south of the Ottawa River. Great Britain wanted to keep most of the French-speaking, ethnic French population of the area within Lower Canada during the 1791 division of Upper and Lower Canada (precursors to the provinces of Ontario and Quebec). It is geographically isolated from the Montérégie region, as it is its only county located north of the St. Lawrence River.

The name relates to the historical division of the area into two counties: Vaudreuil County -- (named after Pierre François de Rigaud, Marquis de Vaudreuil-Cavagnal, governor of New France) for the communities along the Ottawa River, and Soulanges County -- (named after Pierre-Jacques Joybert de Soulanges from Soulanges, Marne, France) for the communities along the St. Lawrence. Soulanges is a name of Québécois derivation, referring to its southerliness.

Since the RCM formation on 14 April 1982, the division of the county into "Vaudreuil" and "Soulanges" is still salient.  The "Vaudreuil" area (consisting of the municipalities of Vaudreuil-Dorion, Saint-Lazare, Hudson, L'Île-Perrot, and others) is closer to Montreal. It is more suburban, populous, and economically and ethnically diverse. By contrast, the Soulanges area (including the municipalities of Saint-Polycarpe, Saint-Zotique, Coteau-du-Lac, Rivière-Beaudette and Les Coteaux) is predominantly rural, agricultural, and ethnically French-Canadian.

Owing to the county's geographic isolation within Quebec, and its growing population as a suburb of the city of Montreal, Elections Canada assigned the electoral district to the county in 1997.

Subdivisions
There are 23 subdivisions within the RCM:

Cities & Towns (9)
 Coteau-du-Lac
 Hudson
 L'Île-Cadieux
 L'Île-Perrot
 Notre-Dame-de-l'Île-Perrot
 Pincourt
 Rigaud
 Saint-Lazare
 Vaudreuil-Dorion

Municipalities (11)
 Les Cèdres
 Les Coteaux
 Rivière-Beaudette
 Saint-Clet
 Saint-Polycarpe
 Saint-Télesphore
 Saint-Zotique
 Sainte-Justine-de-Newton
 Sainte-Marthe
 Terrasse-Vaudreuil
 Très-Saint-Rédempteur

Villages (3)
 Pointe-Fortune
 Pointe-des-Cascades
 Vaudreuil-sur-le-Lac

Demographics

Population

Population History by County (1855-1982)

Population History by Municipality

Language

Transportation

Public Transportation
The region is served by the Exo La Presqu’Île and Exo Sud-Ouest bus services as well as the Vaudreuil-Hudson commuter rail line.

Access Routes
Highways and numbered routes that run through the municipality, including external routes that start or finish at the county border:

 Autoroutes
 
 
 

 Principal Highways
 Developed in the future

 Secondary Highways
 
 
 
 
 

 External Routes

See also
 List of regional county municipalities and equivalent territories in Quebec

References

 
Census divisions of Quebec
Vaudreuil-Dorion